The Two Societies (Jāme'atein) is the nickname given to the coalition of two influential Iranian principlist clerical religious–political groups, Combatant Clergy Association of Tehran and Society of Seminary Teachers of Qom.

The Two Societies declared a shared electoral list for 2006 Iranian Assembly of Experts election and won 69 seats out of 86. In 2016 elections, the two societies did not reach a coalition and issued different lists, eventually winning 64≈66 seats out of 88.

They also dominate Guardian Council.

References 

Political party alliances in Iran
Principlist political groups in Iran
Electoral lists for Assembly of Experts election, 2016
Iranian clerical political groups
Khomeinist groups